Karl Yens (January 11, 1868 – 1945), also Karl Jens was a German-American who was noted for both plein-air paintings of the California impressionist movement as well as Modernism.

Yens was born Karl Julius Heinrich Jens was born in Altona, Hamburg, Germany and trained in art with Max Koch in Berlin and Jean-Joseph Benjamin-Constant and Jean-Paul Laurens in Paris. He emigrated to the U.S. and settled in Laguna Beach, California in 1910. He was a founding member of the California Water Color Society and a member of the Modern Art Society.

List of paintings
 America The Beautiful (1918)
 Arch Beach Tavern
 Dawn, Laguna Beach (1931)
 First Art Gallery, Laguna (1920)
 Fun With Breakers
 In The Garden
 In Yosemite (1919)
 Diogenes, A.K.A. Mr. Mann - The Useful Citizen (1920)
 Nature's Charm
 Study in White (1924)
 Weaver's Camp, Yosemite (1919)
 Woman on Horseback in Yosemite (1919)
 Yosemite Scene (1919)
 Their Castle (1921)

References

19th-century American painters
19th-century American male artists
American male painters
20th-century American painters
20th-century American male artists
German emigrants to the United States
1868 births
1945 deaths
American watercolorists